Daskalakis Athletic Center (DAC) is a  athletic and recreational facility in Philadelphia, Pennsylvania.

The facility is best known for its 2,509-seat multi-purpose arena that is home to multiple Drexel University Dragons sports teams including basketball and wrestling.  While the entire recreation center, including the multi-purpose arena, gym, natatorium, rock climbling wall, and squash canter are located in the athletic center, the "DAC" generally refers solely to the multi-purpose arena.

When originally opened in 1975 as the Physical Education Center, sometimes just referred to as the "New Gym," the facility included grandstands that sat a capacity of 1,800, and was expandable to 2,700 seats with temporary bleachers.

In January 2005, the basketball court was named Cozen Court after being dedicated to former Drexel men's basketball head coach Sam Cozen.

The project, which expanded to an  addition, broke ground in June 2008. Construction finished in December 2009 and parts of the building opened to students in January 2010. The Drexel Recreational Center officially opened in February 2010.

Notable events

Basketball
The DAC hosted games in all or part of the 1993-1996 America East Conference men's basketball tournaments, the 2005 NIT Season Tip-Off, and the 2007 and 2012 National Invitation Tournament.  In 2013, the DAC hosted four games of the 2013 Women's NIT, with the Dragons defeating Utah 46-43 in the final to win the tournament.

The DAC was built in 1974 as the Physical Education and Athletic Center (PEAC) and was renamed in 2001 after a gift from former Drexel Lacrosse player John A. Daskalakis ('63).

The Daskalakis Athletic Center hosted the 2018 and 2022 Colonial Athletic Association women's basketball tournament, and will again host the tournament in 2024.

Concerts

Midnight Madness
The annual Midnight Madness event was held in the arena before the basketball season begins.  The event was similar to those at other universities, as it serves as a pep rally for the entire men's and women's basketball seasons.  During the event, the lineups for the teams are announced, and the annual DAC Pack T-shirt design was also released.  Since 2011, a concert was also held as a closing to the event.  The 2013 event which featured Childish Gambino held an attendance of over 2,200.  In 2014 the event was replaced with the Drexel Fall Fest.
2013: Childish Gambino
2012: Dev and Chiddy Bang
2011: Chiddy Bang

Spring Jam
The annual Spring Jam concert, which is organized by the Drexel CAB, is generally held during the spring semester.  The Spring Jam was performed at the DAC in 2006 before it was relocated to the Drexel Armory in 2007.  Previously, the annual event was held in other areas including the Drexel Academic Quad, and Buckley Green.  In 2011, it was relocated again to Lot F, an open parking area on Drexel's campus between Main Building and 31st Street.  The headlining acts of the Spring Jam concerts performed at the Daskalakis Athletic Center have included:
2006: New Found Glory, My American Heart, Ernest Goodlife Band

Homecoming Concert
January 23, 1997:  Rusted Root, Geggy Tah

Fall Concert
Previous to the Drexel Campus Activities Board hosting the Spring Jam, their annual concert was in the Fall
November 19, 1997: The Wallflowers
1996: No concert
November 18, 1995:  The Smithereens, Ocean Blue

Winter Concert
February, 1978: The J. Geils Band, Kenn Kweder and The Secret Kids

Other Concerts
May 3, 1993:  10,000 Maniacs, Zap Mama
February 27, 1993: Velocity Girl, Low Road, Nasty Nas
March 4, 1978: The J. Geils Band, Ken Kweder and the Secret Kidds

Squash
From 2011 through 2019, the annual US Open of Squash was held in the arena.

Table Tennis
In 2008, the DAC hosted the 2008 U.S. Olympic & National Table Tennis Team Trials.  The event reached a capacity crowd of 2,000.

Tennis
The DAC hosted the World Team Tennis Championship match between the Philadelphia Freedoms and Springfield Lasers on August, 5th 2018.

Arena Renovations

2012–2016
Over the span of multiple years, a staggered renovation took place in the main gym of the recreation center.  The renovations took place during the basketball offseason each year (during Spring and Summer months) as to not interfere with the men's or women's basketball seasons.

2012
After a $3 million gift in support of Drexel athletics from John A. Daskalakis, renovations began in 2012 at the Daskalakis Athletic Center among other athletic facilities.  The renovations completed in the first year of the upgrade were:
Major renovation to the home locker room
A Drexel athletics hall of fame display

2013
In the Summer of 2013, more renovations continued in the main gym including:
A large portion of the bleachers located on the West side of the gym were replaced with cushioned chair-back seating.  This included VIP chair-back seating in the first row.
A small number of additional bleacher seats was added in the Southwest corner

2014
In March 2014, more renovations totaling $7.7M were approved and include:
Chair-back and VIP seating to replace the East bleachers, similar to the West bleacher renovation that occurred the previous offseason
New South bleacher, 28 rows in height and approximately 1,000 seats, to hold the DAC Pack and pep band.  (Previously, the DAC Pack was primarily located at the East bleachers)
Several additional bathrooms, meeting space, a conference/reception area, and basket storage located in the Southwest corner behind the seating
New visitor locker room, located in the Northwest corner

The addition of floor 'pro-style' baskets was also investigated by the design team.  Following their investigation, a decision was made to not implement the floor baskets because they found that the South bleachers would have to be moved back nine feet further from the basketball court, and also that floor baskets generally cause an obstructed view for any fans seated behind the basket.  Because of this, the DAC will continue to use its swing-down style baskets.

2015
Phase 4 of the Daskalakis Athletic Center renovation, completed in October 2015 included: 
New north-end seating, reducing the capacity to 2,509 from 2,532.
Improved concessions

2016
Phases 5 and 6 of the renovation began in May 2016 and were completed in September 2016.  Phase 5 of the renovation involved additions to the basketball court level and includes the addition of bathrooms, offices, ticket booth, conference room, storage rooms, and an audio/visual room for television broadcasts.  Phase 6 included installing an air conditioning system in the arena.

2022
On May 31, 2022, Drexel announced that construction was underway to add an LED video scoreboard, sound system, LED lighting, and an upgraded video production studio to the arena.

See also

 List of NCAA Division I basketball arenas
 32nd St. and Lancaster Ave. Philadelphia Armory

References

External links
Drexel Dragons - Daskalakis Athletic Center
Drexel Recreation Center

College basketball venues in the United States
Drexel Dragons men's basketball
Drexel University
Sports venues in Philadelphia
Basketball venues in Pennsylvania
Squash venues in the United States
Wrestling venues in Pennsylvania
University City, Philadelphia
1975 establishments in Pennsylvania